Illinois Route 19 (abbreviated IL-19, or simply Illinois 19) is a major east–west arterial state highway in northeastern Illinois, United States. It runs from Illinois Route 25 (Liberty St.) in Elgin, to Lake Shore Drive (U.S. Route 41) on the north side of Chicago. For much of its length, it is also known as Irving Park Road and Chicago-Elgin Road.

Route description 

Illinois 19 fluctuates from being a two lane road in rural parts to six lanes by highway interchanges. In Elgin, the road is mostly four lanes, narrowing to two in relatively undeveloped, forested sections between Illinois Route 59 and Elgin. East of Barrington Road, the road becomes a main artery through the western suburbs of Chicago. The Elgin-O'Hare Expressway (now known as Illinois Route 390) was built in part to reduce traffic on Illinois 19 through Roselle and Itasca.

The road narrows from six to two lanes between Schaumburg and Roselle, and again (from four lanes to two) in Medinah and through Itasca. The road then becomes four lanes in Wood Dale and maintains this width to its eastern terminus, except for a narrower stretch between N. Cumberland Avenue (Illinois 171) and N. Austin Avenue in Chicago.

East of Bensenville Illinois 19 becomes one of only seven state highways to enter the city of Chicago. It passes along the current southern border of O'Hare International Airport and serves as the main gateway for western suburbs to access the airport.

At the Tri-State Tollway in Schiller Park, traffic on Illinois 19 may enter the northbound lanes of the tollway. Traffic wishing to enter the southbound lanes must enter at Balmoral (via Mannheim) or Interstate 190 to the north. The Chicago city limits officially start at the Des Plaines River. Illinois 19 runs through the O'Hare, Dunning, Portage Park, Irving Park, North Center and Lake View neighborhoods before ending at a traffic signal beneath Lake Shore Drive (U.S. Route 41).

The road used to be named Chicago-Elgin Road, but east of Elgin it has been renamed Irving Park Road, for the Irving Park neighborhood of Chicago located between Cicero Avenue and the north branch of the Chicago River in Chicago. In Elgin itself, it has since been renamed East Chicago Street. As of 2005, some signage on approaching streets still identified Irving Park Road as Chicago-Elgin Road.

History 
The original Route 19 was designated in 1918 as what is now U.S. Route 14 from Chicago Loop to Harvard. In 1935, the routing was removed, and in 1949 it was reapplied on part of its modern-day routing. As of 1968, IL 72 was cut back from Lake Shore Drive (US 41) to its present terminus.

O'Hare realignment
Irving Park Road once ran straight through where O'Hare International Airport's 04R/22L Runway now sits. The road was realigned to the south in the 1960s in order to build the runway. Again in 2012, the road was realigned to the south as part of the O'Hare Modernization Plan to build runway 10R/28L.

Wood Dale proposed underpass 
On November 16, 2006, aldermen in Wood Dale approved a plan to redesign the intersection of Irving Park Road and Wood Dale Road. The intersection is currently fully interconnected to railroad signals for the active Metra Milwaukee District/West Line tracks, creating a situation where vehicles on both roads may be at risk of being hit by oncoming commuter trains. In addition, freight trains emerge from the Canadian Pacific Railway's Bensenville freight railroad yard during off peak rush hours. After the $45 million reconstruction, Irving Park Road would have crossed underneath the railroad tracks further northwest from the current intersection. Two alternatives were advanced in a city council meeting: Alternate 2, which would move Irving Park Road slightly north, displace 18 businesses but have flood-plain and line-of-sight issues, and Alternate 2A, which would displace 47 homes and 13 businesses.

The plan was killed in early March 2007 after local opposition to a Division Street extension through property owned by Holy Ghost Church. The city has since decided to investigate alternative safety measures at the intersection, including the addition of turn lanes and red-light cameras.

Transportation
The CTA services the 80 Irving Park between Inner Drive and Cumberland Avenue. The 9 Ashland, X9 Ashland Express and 54A North Cicero/Skokie Blvd serve the road for short segments.

The following CTA lines service Irving Park Road:
Red Line at Sheridan Road
Brown Line at Ravenswood Avenue
Blue Line at Kennedy Expressway

Major intersections

References

External links

Illinois Highway Ends: Illinois Route 19

019
Streets in Chicago
U.S. Route 14
Transportation in Kane County, Illinois
Transportation in Cook County, Illinois
Transportation in DuPage County, Illinois